"Canadian Pacific" is a song written by Ray Griff and recorded by American country music artist George Hamilton IV. It was released in June 1969 as the first single from his album Canadian Pacific. The song, about a cross-Canada trip aboard the eponymous railway, peaked at number 25 on the Billboard Hot Country Singles chart. It also reached number 1 on the RPM Country Tracks chart in Canada.

Chart performance

References 

1969 singles
1969 songs
George Hamilton IV songs
Songs about trains
Songs written by Ray Griff